Heiner Mora Mora (born 20 June 1984) is a Costa Rican professional footballer who plays for A.D. Municipal Pérez Zeledón as a wingback.

Club career
Heiner Mora began his career with Santos de Guápiles. He was a regular starter at rightback for the club before moving to rivals Brujas in 2007. After being seldom used by Brujas, Mora moved to CF Universidad de Costa Rica and recaptured his previous form. In 2009, he returned to Brujas and became an instant starter for the club. The following season, he rejoined Santos de Guápiles and his form drew the attention of top Costa Rican side Saprissa who signed Mora on loan in early 2011. He is rumored to join the Seattle Sounders FC.

Mora has been playing for Norwegian side Hønefoss since 2012. Due to multiple issues, including an inhospitable climate, language barriers, inflexible regulations for immigrants and being separated from his family, he has expressed that he will leave and go back to Costa Rica on May 31, even if it means retiring from professional soccer.

In August 2013, Mora signed a one-year contract with Belén to play in the Costa Rican Primera División. In summer 2014 he returned to Saprissa.

After a spell at Pérez Zeledón, Mora joined Segunda División de Costa Rica club C.D. Barrio México in July 2020.

International career
Mora has played for Costa Rica since 2010. He started all three matches for Costa Rica in the 2011 Copa América and played in the 2011 Gold Cup.  Mora missed the 2014 World Cup due to injury and was replaced by David Myrie.

International goals
Scores and results list. Costa Rica's goal tally first.

Personal life
Born to Dagoberto Mora and Luz Marina Mora, he was born and raised in Guácimo, where his father had a papaya farm.

References

External links

1984 births
Living people
People from Limón Province
Association football defenders
Costa Rican footballers
Costa Rica international footballers
2011 Copa Centroamericana players
2011 CONCACAF Gold Cup players
2011 Copa América players
Santos de Guápiles footballers
Brujas FC players
C.F. Universidad de Costa Rica footballers
Deportivo Saprissa players
Hønefoss BK players
Belén F.C. players
Municipal Pérez Zeledón footballers
Liga FPD players
Eliteserien players
Costa Rican expatriate footballers
Expatriate footballers in Norway
Costa Rican expatriate sportspeople in Norway